Ben Taieb (Tarifit: Ben Ṭayeb, ⴱⴻⵏ ⵟⴰⵢⴻⴱ; Arabic: ابن الطيب) is a town in Driouch Province, Oriental, Morocco. It has a population of 60.000.

References

External links

 Nador News, www.ariffino.net

Populated places in Driouch Province